Mount Drummond may refer to
 Mount Drummond (Alberta) in Alberta, Canada
 Mount Drummond (Selkirk Mountains) in British Columbia, Canada
 Mount Drummond (Pacific Ranges) in British Columbia, Canada
 Mount Drummond (South Australia) in South Australia, Australia